First Quality Enterprises, also known as just First Quality, is an American multi-national manufacturing company, headquartered in Great Neck, New York. First Quality produces home care paper products, adult incontinence products, feminine care products, baby care, and flexible packaging.

First Quality was founded in McElhattan, Pennsylvania, by Kambiz Damaghi and his family, who immigrated to the United States from Iran, in 1988, opening their first facility in 1989. As of 2021, they have 9 total facilities, 8 in America and 1 in Canada.

Products 
First Quality produces products like Prevail, Cuties, Plenty, Panda, Incognito, Fletchers, and Dri-Fit.

Locations 
First Quality operates 8 locations in the United States:

 Great Neck, NY (Headquarters)
 Anderson, SC (Two facilities)
 King of Prussia, PA
 Lewistown, PA
 Lock Haven, PA
 Macon, GA
 McElhattan, PA

They also operate 1 facility in Canada:

 Drummondville, QC

References 

Manufacturing companies based in New York (state)
American companies established in 1989